Česko Slovenská SuperStar (English: Czech&Slovak SuperStar) is the joint Czech-Slovak version of Idols merged from Česko hledá SuperStar and Slovensko hľadá SuperStar which previous to that had three individual seasons each.
The fifth season castings were held in Prague, Brno, Ostrava, Žilina, Bratislava and Košice. The season premiered on February 24, 2018 on TV Nova in the Czech Republic and on February 25, 2018 on Markíza in Slovakia, which have also been the broadcast stations for the individual seasons.

Regional auditions
Auditions were held in Bratislava, Košice, Prague, Ostrava, Žilina and Brno in the autumn and winter of 2017.

Super Výber
After castings, remaining 120 contestant entered to the Super Výber.

In the first round, the girls were called in groups of ten to sing acapella in front of the judges. Each girl had a few seconds to sing and after the entire group performed, they found out whether they were eliminated or they would continue in the next round.

The boys did not get to perform at all, the judges told them they all advanced to the next round, due to the smaller number of boys in the contest.

The next round took place at the same night. All contestants were divided into 2 groups, the first one went to perform songs of their choice in front of the judges. The second group did not perform because they had impressed the judges before.

After the first two rounds, 60 contestants made it to the second day.

On the next day, the contestants sang solo with an acoustic band.

The songs they had to perform were:

Billionaire - Bruno Mars, Travie McCoy

Diamonds - Rihanna

Raise Your Glass - P!nk

Something Just Like This - The Chainsmokers, Coldplay

Rockabye - Clean Bandit, Sean Paul, Anne Marie

Love Yourself - Justin Bieber

Use Somebody - Kings Of Leon

Treat You Better - Shawn Mendes

Radioactive - Imagine Dragons

Million Reasons - Lady Gaga

Shape Of You - Ed Sheeran

Words - Emma Drobná

After this round, 20 contestants were sent home.

In the last round, 40 best contestants sang in pairs, where either 1 or both contestants were eliminated, or in some cases, both got through.

Four contestants received a “wild card” from judges, which meant their immediate advancement to the semi-finals.

Those contestants were: Jakub Pružinský, Zuzana Chalupová, Dominik Gerda and Adéla Ferencová.

The last round was Dlouhá cesta/Dlhá cesta in which 16 contestants made it to the semi-finals, creating the top 20.

Semi-final
20 semifinalists were revealed in April when the show premiered on screen.

Top 10 - Boys

Top 10 - Girls

Finalist

Finals
Ten contestants made it to the finals. TOP 10 consists of 3 Slovak boys, 1 Czech boy, 1 Filipino boy, 2 Slovak girls and 3 Czech girl. Every final night has its theme. Audience can vote for contestants from the very beginning of the show, voting ends during result show on the same day.

Top 10 – No. 1 Hits

 Group performance: "Counting Stars" (OneRepublic)

Top 8 – Dedications

 Group performance: "Wake Me Up" (Avicii)

Top 6 – Czech and Slovak Songs & Duets

Top 5 – Old hits & New hits

 Group performance: "Spomaľ" (Katarína Knechtová)

Top 3 – Grand Finale

 TOP 10: "Príbeh nekončí" (Anthem of SuperStar 2009 & 2015)

Top 2 – Super Final

Elimination chart

Contestants who appeared on other seasons/shows
 Tereza Anna Mašková was a semi-finalist on Česko Slovensko má talent season 1.
 Adéla Ferencová was a finalist on Česko Slovensko má talent season 2.
 Karmen Pál-Baláž appeared on X-Faktor Hungary season 7. She was eliminated before Judge's House.

References

External links 
Official Czech homepage hosted by Nova
Official Slovak homepage hosted by Markíza

Season 05
2010s Czech television series
2010s Slovak television series
2018 Czech television seasons